Cambridge Christian School (CCS) is a co-educational, private, non-denominational Christian school serving grades PreK–12, located in Tampa, Florida, United States. CCS is a college preparatory school accredited by Christian Schools of Florida.

History 
Cambridge Christian School was established as Seminole Presbyterian School in 1964.  The school was started and sponsored by the Seminole Presbyterian Church, now Christ Central Presbyterian Church.  By the end of the 1990s, the growing needs of the school necessitated its formal separation from the church.  

In 2000, the school became its own legal entity and changed its name to the Cambridge School.  The church and school would continue to share the Habana Avenue campus for the next few years as the school decided whether to move to a different location. 

In 2003, the Board of Trustees voted to change the name of the school to Cambridge Christian School, decided that it would remain on the Habana campus, began the process of purchasing the campus from Seminole Presbyterian Church, and began to acquire adjacent land for future expansion. The name change became effective in July 2007.

Since August 2020 CCS has offered in-person classes for students who meet COVID-19 screening protocols.

Curriculum 
CCS offers three tracks for high school students: college prep and honors tracks, as well as digital, science, and engineering STEM programs.

Co-curricular activities 
In addition to athletic opportunities, CCS has offered students service and cultural opportunities.

References

External links
 Cambridge Christian School
 Florida Council of Independent Schools
 National Council for Private School Accreditation

Christian schools in Florida
Educational institutions established in 1964
Preparatory schools in Florida
High schools in Tampa, Florida
Private high schools in Florida
Private middle schools in Florida
Private elementary schools in Florida
1964 establishments in Florida